The 2008 State of the Union Address was given by the 43rd president of the United States, George W. Bush, on January 28, 2008, at 9:00 p.m. EST, in the chamber of the United States House of Representatives to the 110th United States Congress. It was Bush's seventh and final State of the Union Address and his eighth and final speech to a joint session of the United States Congress. Presiding over this joint session was the House speaker, Nancy Pelosi, accompanied by Dick Cheney, the vice president, in his capacity as the president of the Senate.

Topics
The White House indicated beforehand that President Bush's speech would mention the following policies:

Democratic response
In keeping with tradition of Democrats from red states giving the response, Governor of Kansas Kathleen Sebelius delivered the Democratic response from the Governor's Mansion in Topeka. It has been noted that she focused not on the usual Democratic rebuttal, but more so on the need to get past partisan politics to get the important legislation passed in a timely manner. She was picked by Democratic congressional leaders to make the response because of her ability to reach across partisan lines.

Texas state Senator Leticia Van de Putte gave the Democratic response in Spanish.

Libertarian response
Libertarian Party Chair William Redpath issued a written response to the State of the Union on behalf of the national Libertarian Party.

Steve Kubby, a candidate for the Libertarian Party's 2008 presidential nomination, delivered his own "State of the Union address" via Internet video on January 25, 2008, three days before President Bush's speech.  Framed as a preemption rather than merely a response, Kubby's speech attempted to predict the themes President Bush would strike and offered Kubby's own proposals in their stead.

See also
2008 United States presidential election

References

External links

 2008 State of the Union Address (full transcript), The American Presidency Project, UC Santa Barbara
2008 State of the Union Address (video) at C-SPAN
2008 State of the Union Response (video) at C-SPAN
2008 State of the Union Response (transcript)
State of the Union Address (audio) at AmericanRhetoric.com

State of the Union Address 2008
State of the Union Address
State of the Union Address
State of the Union Address
State of the Union Address
State of the Union Address
Presidency of George W. Bush
State of the Union Address 2008
2008